Mohammad-Ali Khan was an early 18th-century Safavid official, who served as the governor (beglarbeg) of Azerbaijan from 1719 to 1720. Described as a "tyranical governor", Mohammad-Ali Khan served during the chaotic years in which the Safavid state was crumbling and in a state of heavy decline. In early 1719 he was forced to flee following an uprising by the people of his province. After the event, the Iranian government at Isfahan is said to have responded by imposing a heavy fine on Tabriz (the provincial capital) and by ordering the inhabitants to obey the local authorities.

Sources
  
 

18th-century deaths
Safavid governors of Azerbaijan
18th-century people of Safavid Iran